The 2013 PSA World Series Finals is the men's edition of the 2013 PSA World Series Finals (Prize money : $110 000). The top eight players in the PSA World Series 2013 were qualified for the event, which took place at the Westwood Club in Richmond, Virginia in the United States from March 15 to March 19, 2014. Ramy Ashour won his first PSA World Series Finals trophy, beating Mohamed El Shorbagy in the final.

Seeds

Group stage results

Pool A

Pool B

Draw and results

See also
PSA World Tour 2013
PSA World Series 2013
PSA World Series Finals

References

External links
PSA World Series website
World Series Final 2013 official website
World Series Final 2013 Squashinfo website

PSA World Tour
W
PSA World Series
PSA World Series